Thiviers is a railway station in Thiviers, Nouvelle-Aquitaine, France. The station is located on the Limoges-Bénédictins - Périgueux railway line. The station is served by TER (local) services operated by SNCF. 

The station is served by regional trains to Bordeaux, Périgueux and Limoges.

References

Railway stations in Dordogne